Michael Hunter, Jr. (born July 10, 1988) is an American professional boxer who challenged for the WBO junior heavyweight title in 2017. As an amateur he won the National Championships as a super heavyweight in 2007 and 2009, and qualified for the 2012 Olympics in the heavyweight division. He is the son of late professional boxer Mike "the Bounty" Hunter.

Amateur career

In 2006 at the age of 18 he made it to the finals of the National Golden Gloves with only five bouts where he lost to Felix Stewart and won the bronze medal at the Under-19 World Championships in Morocco by scoring wins over Andrey Volkov of Russia and Pavel Kulda of Lithuania before losing in the semifinals to eventual winner Cristian Ciocan of Romania.

In 2007 now based in Las Vegas he beat future (2008) champ Lenroy Thompson and narrowly outpointed two-time winner Mike Wilson to win the US championships.

At the Olympic trials 2007 he easily beat Wilson-conqueror Kimdo Bethel twice and won the tournament.
At the World Championships 2007 he beat Kurban Günebakan 30:7 and Jasem Delavari and lost only 15:22 to world #1 and European champion Islam Timurziev.

At the first qualifier he beat Oscar Rivas but lost to Cuban Robert Alfonso 1:9, at the second he beat Didier Bence but lost to Jose Payares and thus failed to qualify for the 2008 Olympics.

In 2009 he edged out Thompson 8:7 and once again became national champ.

Heavyweight, 201 lbs
In 2011 he dropped down to 201 lbs and won the Golden Gloves title there.

In June 2011, Hunter helped Wladimir Klitschko in his preparation for his fight against David Haye, acting as his sparring partner in the last few weeks building up to the fight.

He managed to qualify for the London Olympics by winning his qualifier against Julio Castillo and Yamil Peralta. At the Olympics, he was eliminated in the first round by Artur Beterbiyev.

Professional career

In March 2013 Hunter made his professional debut defeating Chad Davis by third-round TKO in a bout held in Phoenix, Arizona. He then scored another KO on August 30.

On April 8, 2017, Hunter fought his first career title fight, against Oleksandr Usyk for the WBO cruiserweight title. Hunter boxed well in the beginning, but couldn't manage to land effectively on Usyk. Usyk, on the other hand, managed to hurt Hunter multiple times, almost knocking him out towards the end of the fight. Despite a courageous effort from Hunter, Usyk was declared the winner via unanimous decision.

On October 13, 2018, Hunter fought Martin Bakole, his biggest test at heavyweight up to that point. Bakole was visibly the bigger man of the two, but Hunter managed to outbox and hurt him during the fight,  eventually stopping it in the final seconds of the tenth, and last, round.

In his next fight, Hunter fought veteran heavyweight Alexander Ustinov. Hunter wore Ustinov down by scoring two knockdowns, one in the eighth round and one in the ninth round, after which Ustinov's corner threw in the towel.

On September 13, 2019, Hunter, ranked #9 by the WBA, #10 by the IBF, #12 by the WBO and #14 by the WBC at heavyweight, fought Sergey Kuzmin, ranked #5 by the WBA and #7 by the IBF. Hunter got his sixth win in a row in convincing fashion, scoring 117-110 and all three judges' scorecards.

On December 7, 2019, on the undercard of Andy Ruiz Jr. vs. Anthony Joshua II, Hunter faced former WBA (Regular) heavyweight champion Alexander Povetkin. Povetkin was ranked #6 by the WBA and WBC and #10 by the IBF at heavyweight, while Hunter was ranked #7 by the WBA and IBF, #8 by the WBO and #14 by the WBA.  Both fighters fought well and were aggressive at given points of the fight, making for a very entertaining bout. The fight would end up being a draw, one judge scoring the fight 115-113 in favor of Povetkin, one scoring it 115-113 for Hunter, while the third judge had it even, 114-114.

Professional boxing record

References

External links
 
Article
Profile
2009 Nationals
Michael Hunter Amateur Boxing Record
Michael Hunter - Profile, News Archive & Current Rankings at Box.Live

1988 births
Living people
Heavyweight boxers
Winners of the United States Championship for amateur boxers
Boxers at the 2012 Summer Olympics
Olympic boxers of the United States
National Golden Gloves champions
Boxers from California
American male boxers